Muhammad Rayhan Nur Fadillah (born 6 May 2004) is an Indonesian badminton player who is affiliated with the Djarum club. He was part of Indonesia team that won a bronze medal at the 2022 World Junior Championships.

Career 
Fadillah joined the Djarum badminton club in 2015.

2020–2021 
Together with Rahmat Hidayat, they won their first junior tournament at the Dutch Junior International Grand Prix in 2020 after beating junior rivals Junaidi Arif and Muhammad Haikal. In that same year, Hidayat and Fadillah were also runners-up at the German Junior International, losing in the finals to their opponents whom they previously beaten in the Dutch Junior. 

In 2021, they were runners-up at the Denmark Junior International Series.

2022 
In 2022, Fadillah and Hidayat won the Lithuanian International after beating Kenji Lovang and Léo Rossi in the final. In October, he participated in the Suhandinata Cup, where he won all his matches during the competition, and Indonesia team captured the bronze medal.

In late November, they participated in Bahrain tournament and reach semi-finals of Bahrain International Series and won the Bahrain International Challenge.

2023 
In January, Fadillah and Hidayat played at the home tournament, Indonesia Masters, but had to lose in the qualifying round. In the next tournament, they lost in the quarter-finals of the Thailand Masters from 3rd seed fellow Indonesian pair Muhammad Shohibul Fikri and Bagas Maulana in rubber games.

Achievements

BWF International Challenge/Series (2 titles) 
Men's doubles

  BWF International Challenge tournament
  BWF International Series tournament
  BWF Future Series tournament

BWF Junior International (1 title, 2 runners-up) 
Boys' doubles

  BWF Junior International Grand Prix tournament
  BWF Junior International Challenge tournament
  BWF Junior International Series tournament
  BWF Junior Future Series tournament

Performance timeline

National team 
 Junior level

Individual competitions

Senior level 
 Men's doubles

References

External links 
 

2004 births
Living people
People from Tanah Bumbu Regency
Sportspeople from South Kalimantan
Indonesian male badminton players
21st-century Indonesian people